Queen's Park Football Club is a Scottish professional football club based in Glasgow, which currently plays in the Scottish Championship, the second tier of the Scottish football pyramid. Queen's Park is the oldest association football club in Scotland, having been founded in 1867, and is the 10th oldest in the world.

The club was fully amateur for the first 152 years and has played in white and black hoops as shirt colours for the vast majority of its existence. 
For many years, the club was the only fully amateur club in the Scottish professional leagues, until its membership voted to end that status in November 2019. The club's amateur status was reflected by its Latin motto, 'Ludere Causa Ludendi' – 'To Play for the Sake of Playing'.

Queen's Park is also the only Scottish football club to have played in the FA Cup Final, achieving this feat in both 1884 and 1885. With 10 titles, Queen's Park has won the Scottish Cup the third most times of any club, behind only Celtic and Rangers, although their last such win was in 1893. Having also been the first winners, Queen's were the record holders of the Scottish Cup for 51 years until Celtic claimed the trophy for the 11th time in 1925.

For over a century, the club's home was Hampden Park in south-east Glasgow, a Category 4 stadium which is also the home of the Scotland national team. The club are due to move into their reserve and training ground adjacent to the main stadium, Lesser Hampden, with plans to redevelop it into a 1,774-seat stadium.

History

Beginnings (1867–68)
The Queen's Park Football Club was founded on 9 July 1867 with the words: "Tonight at half past eight o'clock a number of gentlemen met at No. 3 Eglinton Terrace for the purpose of forming a football club."

Gentlemen from the local YMCA took part in football matches in the local Glasgow area which gave the club its name. During the inaugural meeting, debate raged over the club's name. Proposals included: 'The Celts'; 'The Northern', and 'Morayshire'. Perhaps such choice of names suggest a Highland influence within the new club. After much deliberation, 'Queen's Park' was adopted and carried, but only by a majority of one vote. Although Queen's was not the first club in Britain, that honour going to Edinburgh's Foot-Ball Club, formed in 1824, they can certainly claim to be the first Association club in Scotland. Opposition first came in the form of a now defunct Glaswegian side called Thistle F.C. and Queen's won 2–0 on 1 August 1868.

Early domination (1868–1900) 

Within the context of the emerging Association game in Scotland, the historian and broadcaster Bob Crampsey compared the role of the Queen's Park club with that of the Marylebone Cricket Club in Cricket and The Royal and Ancient Golf Club of St Andrews in Golf. The Glasgow club's control of the early playing rules in Scotland, early management of the Scotland national team, and instigation of the Scottish Football Association and Scottish Challenge Cup provide evidence of its status as the ‘Premier’ or ‘Senior’ club of Scotland.

On 30 November 1872, Scotland faced England at the West of Scotland Cricket Club ground at Hamilton Crescent. For the one and only time all eleven Scots players were from Queen's Park and they wore blue jerseys, as those were the current colours of Queen's. 4,000 spectators watched Scotland play with a 2–2–6 formation and England with a 1–1–8 line-up.

Queen's Park formed the Scottish Football Association on 13 March 1873, with eight other clubs. The match against Dumbreck on 25 October was the first match to be played at the first Hampden Park. It was also the first match which saw Queen's Park players wear their custom black and white hooped jerseys, which lent the club the nickname of 'The Spiders'. David Wotherspoon, a Queen's Park player and committee member, has been credited with the introduction of the black and white hoops. Most importantly, it was the first Scottish Cup tie and Scottish competitive match for the club and Queen's won 7–0. In the final, Queen's defeated Clydesdale 2–0 at Hampden.

Success in the Scottish Cup followed in the next two years with final victories over Renton and Third Lanark. In drawing 2–2 with Clydesdale in the 1875 semi-final, Queen's conceded their first ever goals. Defeat for the club was first experienced with a 2–1 defeat to Vale of Leven in the 5th round in December 1876. Third Lanark and Rangers eliminated the Spiders before Queen's reclaimed the cup in 1880 with a win over Thornliebank. Dumbarton were beaten in the final in successive years. In 1881, Queen's had to beat them twice after Dumbarton successfully appealed that the crowd at Kinning Park had encroached following a 2–1 defeat. Dumbarton got revenge in 1883 but Queen's won again in 1884 without even having to play the final after Vale of Leven refused to play on the date stipulated by the SFA.

In the early days of England's FA Cup, Scottish clubs were often invited to compete. As a result, Queen's Park twice finished runners-up in this competition, in 1884, when they lost 2–1 to Blackburn Rovers and in 1885, when they lost 2–0, again to Blackburn Rovers. 1886–87 was the last time that they entered the FA Cup competition.

Afterwards, the domination in the competition that the club had enjoyed began to lessen as more teams strengthened. The trophy was reclaimed in 1890 with a replay win over Vale of Leven and the club's 10th and final success came in 1893 with a 2–1 win over Celtic at Ibrox. In the same year, professional football was acknowledged by the SFA. Three years previously, the Scottish Football League had been formed but Queen's declined to join, stressing their amateur principles Queen's Park joined the Scottish League in 1900 and took part in the 1900–01 season (being added directly to the top division rather than the lower division).

Nevertheless, the Queen's players of the time were held in high regard throughout the country and some are still remembered today. Charles Campbell won eight Scottish Cup winners medals with Queen's and earned 13 Scotland caps. Wattie Arnott was a near ever-present in the successful teams of the 1880s. Robert Smyth McColl scored a remarkable number of goals for Queen's and soon moved on to Newcastle United and Rangers. In an unprecedented move, he returned to Queen's and scored six goals in his final match. Andrew Watson was the first black football player in Britain. He won three Scotland caps and starred in one of the club's earliest sides. J.A.H Catton, a notable sports editor, named Watson in his all-time Scotland team in 1926.

Pioneers of the modern passing game

Queen's Park are accredited with introducing a collective and 'scientific' form of team based passing which would become known as 'combination' football. Although rudimentary forms of passing existed prior to 1872, and Queen's themselves appear to have indulged in this, the combination game as a systematic form of passing was being played by the club at the time of the first official international match between Scotland and England. This changed the nature of the Association game as the culture in London at this time was largely one of dribbling and 'backing up'. Scotland's promotion of the combination game would ultimately lead to the introduction of professionalism in England in 1885, due to the large importation of Scottish players (known as Scotch Professors) into the midlands and the north of England.

During the late 1860s and early 1870s the club practised regularly and experimented with playing styles. According to Richard Robinson, who wrote the club's official 50th anniversary history,Mondays, Wednesdays and Saturdays were fixed upon as the nights for play...Whoever selected the teams on practising nights had the power to place their men on the field, or appoint substitutes, and the players shall be bound to adhere to their instructions.Robinson also explains the means by which the passing game was developed,The club... never neglected practice, and this practice was indulged in systematically. Sides were arranged— North v. South of Eglinton Toll, Reds v. Blues, Light v. Heavy Weights, President's Team v. J. Smith's Team (a series of six games), and Clerks v. The Field, etc. In these games the dribbling and passing, which raised the Scottish game to the level of a fine art, were developed. Dribbling was a characteristic of English play, and it was not until very much later that the Southerners came to see that the principles laid down in the Queen's Park method of transference of the ball, accompanied by strong backing up, were those which got the most out of a team. Combination was the chief characteristic of the Queen's Park play.Queen's were certainly playing a passing game by the time of their FA Cup tie (March 1872) with Wanderers, the most successful English side of the 1870s. Of the Queen's Park team, The Field magazine notes that, "They dribble little and usually convey the ball by a series of long kicks, combined with a judicious plan of passing on." It is the first official international match, played on 30 November 1872, where the first reference is given to their style as a culture of passing. The Graphic, a London-based weekly illustrated newspaper, provides the following insight into the game,Individual skill was generally on England's side, the dribbling of Kirke-Smith, Brockbank and Ottaway being very fine, while Welch, half-back, showed himself a safe and good kick. The Southrons, however, did not play to each other so well as their opponents, who seem to be adepts in passing the ball.The Glasgow Herald report on the game makes the following observation of the differences between both sides,

<blockquote>The Englishmen had all the advantage of weight, their average being about two stones heavier than the Scotchmen and they had also the advantage in pace. The strong point of the home club was that they played excellently well together.</blockquote>

The newspaper article which features Queen's Park's 5–0 victory over Wanderers in October 1875 (a match in which C.W. Alcock and the Anglo Scot A.F. Kinnaird played in for Wanderers) gives a concise description of the style of combination adopted by the club, particularly in the section which describes the second and third goals,

After a “hand” within thirty yards of the Wanderers’ lines, Weir got possession, and, successfully charging the English forwards, passed it on to Herriot, who in turn placed it to Campbell, who by a well judged kick dropped the ball just below the bar, thus securing another goal for the Scotsmen in sixteen minutes. No sooner had the English captain started the ball than Herriot, Weir and Lawrie, by neat passing sent it back, and after the backs and half backs had shown good play, the two M'Neills brought it along the left side, and passing it to Lawrie, the latter made a shot for goal, but the ball passed just outside the goal post. The play was now in the centre, the Queen’s Park men dribbling and passing, while their opponents indulged chiefly in heavy kicking. In 33 minutes from the commencement of operations H. M'Neill, obtaining possession, kicked the ball to Herriot, who unselfishly serving it to Lawrie, the latter again made a shot for goal, this time with more success, as the ball, passing above the goalkeeper’s head, went clean through thus obtaining the third goal.

Queen's Park in the Football Association

In 1870 Queen's joined The Football Association which is based in London – the only football governing body in existence at the time. Their main attraction was to the new Challenge Cup and contributions were made to pay for the trophy. Queen's reached the first semi-finals in 1872 but had to withdraw due to lack of funds after drawing their first competitive match 0–0 with The Wanderers at the Kennington Oval. Financial constraints meant that Queen's played little part in the competition until 1884 where they stormed to the final before losing 2–1 to Blackburn Rovers at The Oval. Another loss to Blackburn the following year was the closest Queen's got to winning the English trophy. In 1887, Scottish clubs were banned from entering by the Scottish Football Association. Although the solid crossbar first appeared in the Sheffield Rules code, Queen's Park was responsible for its use in Association football when the club successfully put forward a motion for its introduction at a meeting of the Football Association in 1875.

Queen's Park were invited to play in the annual Sheriff of London Charity Shield, a precursor of the FA Community Shield in 1899 which pitted the best amateur and professional sides of the season against each other. They would play the Football League First Division champions Aston Villa. The amateur side was usually represented by Corinthian, however Queen's Park had defeated them 4–1 at Hampden Park earlier that year and the trophy committee decided that they deserved the honour. The match ended in a scoreless draw which saw the sides share the honour, holding the trophy for six months each.

Queen's in the Scottish League top flight (1900–58)
However, as the 20th century drew nearer, Queen's found themselves playing in only cup competitions and the Glasgow League. A remarkable run to the 1900 Scottish Cup Final saw Queen's only narrowly lose 4–3 to Celtic. The previous 25 years had Queen's achieve great success in cup competition but after ten years of resistance they finally took the big step to the Scottish League, first entering Division One in 1900–01.

Queen's struggled with top-flight football and the professional sides which surrounded them. An early high-point was a 1–0 victory over Celtic at the opening of the new Hampden Park in 1903. By previous standards, however, unspectacular seasons followed and the club even finished in the relegation zone on five occasions. Queen's were spared by vote until 1922 when, after a few solid seasons, the team were eventually relegated in second-last place. Queen's bounced back immediately, winning Division Two at the first attempt. In a league season of 24 victories and only five defeats, the Spiders even managed a 4–3 win over Celtic in the Glasgow Cup, with James McAlpine scoring a hat-trick. McAlpine's fine play inspired Queen's to their greatest ever placing in the Scottish League, when they finished 5th in Division One in 1929. He would go on to set a goal scoring record for the club and his appearance record was only beaten by Ross Caven at the turn of the next century. In 1928, the same side also came closest to any Spiders team since 1900 to winning the Scottish Cup but lost 2–1 to Celtic in the semi-finals.

World War II helped Queen's stay in the top league a little longer as at the end of 1938–39 season, the club were relegated. Six seasons in the Southern League followed, and it gave youth and many new players a chance to develop at Hampden as the players of before left to serve their country. Bobby Brown was one such player who started at Queen's in 1939 but left in 1941 to serve as a pilot. When he returned at the end of the War, he found his goalkeeping position occupied by a teenage Ronnie Simpson who had made his debut at the age of 14. Although obviously a bleak time for everyone, this period gave many footballers at Queen's Park an opportunity to play at the highest level under little pressure.

When War ended, Queen's joined the Scottish 'A' Division, where they stayed for three seasons, before relegation in 1948. The next few years were erratic but gradually a great team came together. Fourth place in 1954–55 was followed by first in 1955–56. The side was composed of players familiar with each other and the success was a reward for such longstanding legends as Charlie Church and Bert Cromar. Cromar played in every league game, as did goalkeeper Frank Crampsey (brother of journalist and Queen's fan Bob), who kept 17 clean sheets. Queen's only lasted two seasons in the top Division and were relegated in 1958, having only won four league games all season, and losing heavily on many occasions.

League reconstruction (1958–1994)
With stalwarts such as Cromar, Hastie and Omand all having moved on, the mid-1960s saw a new side which promised much. Future Scotland Internationalist Bobby Clark played in goal in 1964–65 season as Queen's finished fourth. That finish was again achieved in 1968, with Queen's winning 20 games (eight in succession towards the end) and scoring 76 goals. It was a formidable side which featured established Spiders Malky Mackay Sr. (the father of Malky Mackay), Peter Buchanan and Eddie Hunter. Ultimately, no success was gained, however, and as that side splintered, the club toiled until the mid-70s.

The 1975–76 season saw the reconstruction of the Scottish Leagues and Queen's entered the Second Division (third tier). Coinciding with this, Queen's appointed a head coach for the first time. Davie McParland led Queen's to 4th place but left at the end of the season to join Partick Thistle. Joe Gilroy was his successor and Queen's finished 5th, 7th and 13th under his guidance before his departure at the end of 1978–79.

Former player Eddie Hunter took charge and within two seasons, Queen's had been promoted as 1980–81 champions. The talent in the side was obvious. Derek Atkins was an ever-present in goal, John McGregor a high scoring defender and Jimmy Nicholson and Gerry McCoy netted a combined tally of 28 goals. Much of the side was inexperienced, with full-back Bobby Dickson one of the few who had been a mainstay in previous years. After a highly respectable finish of 8th the following season, Queen's finished bottom and were relegated in 1983. The main reason for this was the loss of some of the best players who had won promotion. In particular, John McGregor and Alan Irvine departed, leaving for Liverpool and Everton respectively. During the same season, Queen's lost 2–1 to Rangers at Hampden in the Scottish Cup quarter-finals.

Recovery took a while but eventually a good side featuring Stevie Ross, Kenny Brannigan, Ian McCall and Ross Caven finished 4th in 1985–86 – winning three more games than the Championship side of 1981. Queen's lost narrowly by 2–1 at Celtic Park in the Fourth round of the Scottish Cup in the February 1986.

1987–88 was a further improvement but 21 victories was only enough for 3rd place. 1990–91 was another season of frustration as Queen's squandered a chance for promotion after having been in contention for so long and finished 5th, only four points behind 2nd place Montrose.

Modern history (1994–2019)

Eddie Hunter
Eddie Hunter was fired in December 1994 as Queen's failed to recapture the achievements of the previous decade. Former Alloa Athletic manager Hugh McCann was appointed as his successor but after an 8th-place finish in the new 10 team Third Division, he left the club. Graeme Elder took over as player/coach but the team continued their disappointing run and he eventually resigned. A happier memory from this time was the 5–1 demolition of Albion Rovers at Hampden in August 1997, the opposition finishing the match with seven players. There was also an incredible 5–5 draw at East Fife in Hunter's last season, with fan favourite Brian McPhee scoring four goals for Queen's.

John McCormack
The club's constitution was changed prior to the appointment of the next manager, which meant that Queen's could sign former professionals provided they were not paid by the club. Former Dundee manager John McCormack was unveiled in July 1998 as the new head coach. Like Eddie Hunter, McCormack succeeded in winning the league after just two seasons. The new boss used the new legislation to great effect and even persuaded the club to allow the loaning of professionals. The ex-pros and the committed amateurs combined to give Queen's a superb start to the league season and it was November before defeat was felt. A 4–0 loss to challengers Forfar Athletic towards the end of the season was quickly forgotten as Queen's won their last five matches, clinching the Championship at Cowdenbeath on the final day of 1999–2000. The addition of ex-pros such as Neil Inglis, Paul Martin, Graham Connell and Johnny Whelan helped. The late loan signing of Paul Walker from Stranraer also proved to be very shrewd as he scored two winning goals in the final run-in. After nearly 20 years of service to the club, Ross Caven won a Championship medal and there was also success for the hard-working Danny Ferry who had been with Queen's through the lean spells of the 90s.

Having won promotion, the Spiders only lasted one season in the Second Division. A good start was made but after the New Year results became increasingly hard to come by and Queen's were relegated on the last day on goal difference. The following season featured a new and largely inexperienced team and Queen's did not win a match until November. There was a period of revival for the team and some great results were achieved, but the poor start meant that Queen's finished bottom of the Third Division, and thus, bottom of Scottish football, for the first time in their history. The start to the following season was unspectacular but the team managed to get to the semi-finals of the Challenge Cup before losing 4–3 to Brechin City at Hampden. Months before, McCormack had been made part-time by Queen's. When Morton made an approach for his services in November 2002, he left to take the full-time position.

Kenny Brannigan
After a lengthy wait, former player Kenny Brannigan was announced as the new manager of Queen's Park in January 2003. His short term at the club was unsuccessful and only a couple of memorable results were achieved, notably a 2–1 win over Inverness Caledonian Thistle in the League Cup. A reasonable start to season 2004–05 came to a halt when Brannigan physically confronted a player and a supporter during a match against Elgin City. Queen's lost the match 1–0 and Brannigan lost his job.

Billy Stark
Billy Stark was installed as Kenny Brannigan's replacement in August 2004 and the season ended with Queen's in 4th place. Inconsistency prevented Queen's from reaching the first ever play-offs the following season but in 2006–07 the Spiders were promoted. Not unlike the successful side of 1981, there were few veterans, and the team mostly consisted of young players with little or no experience of football away from Queen's Park. In August 2006, Queen's defeated SPL side Aberdeen in a League Cup penalty shoot-out to record one of their greatest ever victories. League form dramatically improved after the New Year as only one home match was lost in the second half of the season. Queen's went on a run of eight consecutive victories, during which goalkeeper David Crawford set a new club record by keeping seven successive shut-outs. Queen's finished 3rd in the league, acquiring only one less point than the side which had won the Championship 7 years earlier. Promotion was achieved via the play-offs. Queen's defeated Arbroath in the semi-finals 4–1 on aggregate and then East Fife in the final 7–2 on aggregate. Richard Sinclair and Frankie Carroll became the first players in the club's history to win promotion on more than one occasion. Queen's Park's cavalier playing style was one which was lauded by coaches from opposition sides during the season and they were acknowledged as being well worthy of their promotion.

Combining the end of the promotion season and the start of 2007–08, Queen's managed 11 consecutive victories (8 league wins) in all competition. Although Billy Stark had signed a new contract in the summer of 2007, he left midway through the following season to take the managerial post of the Scotland under-21s.

Gardner Speirs
Stark was replaced in February 2008 by Gardner Speirs who secured safety from relegation and an 8th-place finish. Queen's lost many talented players in the summer of 2008 to paying clubs but only narrowly lost 2–1 to Celtic in the Scottish Cup fifth round in February 2009.

After finishing 9th in the Second Division in season 2008–09 and then being defeated in the end-of-season play-off semi-finals (losing 1–2 on aggregate v Stenhousemuir), Queen's Park were relegated to the Third Division. In January 2010, David Murray scored the Spiders 3000th competitive home goal.

Despite poor starts in their last two Third Division campaigns, on both occasions Queen's Park did enough to qualify for the end of season playoffs. They lost at the semi final stage in both ties, firstly to Arbroath and then to Albion Rovers. In season 2012–13, faced with greater public scrutiny due to Rangers being accepted into the bottom tier, Queen's had their best season in years, finishing third and playing attractive attacking football. They failed to achieve promotion in the play-offs and the side, which contained players such as Andrew Robertson, Lawrence Shankland, Aidan Connolly, Paul McGinn and Blair Spittal was broken up in the close season.

Gus Macpherson
After finishing fourth in the 2015–16 league season, they were promoted after beating Clyde in the playoff final. Queen's Park celebrated their 150th birthday on 9 July 2017, with events held to mark the occasion. Following a ninth-place finish in 2017–18, they were relegated to Scottish League Two at the end of the season after a 3–2 aggregate loss to Stenhousemuir in the play-offs.

Mark Roberts
In the 2018–19 Scottish Challenge Cup, the Spiders recorded a 4–2 penalty win over Champions League regulars, The New Saints of the Welsh Premier League in the Second Round of the competition.

It was announced on 31 December 2019 that Roberts had left Queen's Park by mutual consent.

Turning professional and back to back promotions (2019–present)
A major change to the club's constitution was proposed in 2019, with its members asked if they wished to end amateur status and to allow the hiring of professional players. Part of the motivation for the proposal was that several good players had been lost without the club receiving any compensation due to its status. The club's members voted to move to professional status following a motion on 14 November 2019. 91% of QPFC members elected to go pro, enabling the club to sign players to longer-term contracts and collect transfer fees.

Former Dundee United and Falkirk coach Ray McKinnon was appointed as the club's new head coach in January 2020. He became the first manager of Queen's Park since the 1980s to secure two wins in his first two matches in charge, before the league two season was ended prematurely due to the COVID-19 pandemic. In the summer of 2020, Queen's Park signed many professional players from higher placed Scottish teams including Grant Gillespie, Jai Quitongo and former Dundee United striker Simon Murray to name but a few and the team went on to win the 2020–21 Scottish League Two title and gain promotion to League One.

On 12 January 2021, former Motherwell and Hibernian CEO Leeann Dempster was appointed as the club's new chief executive.

Ray McKinnon would leave his role as head coach at the end of the 2020–21 season.

Owen Coyle was announced as the new manager of Queen's Park in March 2022.

Queen's Park were promoted to the 2022–23 Scottish Championship after beating Dunfermline Athletic 1–0 in the play–off semi-final and then beating Airdrieonians 3–2 in the final of the Championship play-off, thus securing back to back promotions from the fourth to the second tier of Scottish football.

Stadium 
When Queen's Park was formed in 1867, the club initially played on the Queen's Park Recreation Ground at Crosshill, from where they took their name. In 1873 they moved to their first enclosed ground, naming it Hampden Park after a nearby street, Hampden Terrace. A grandstand and pavilion were erected over the next few years and the ground became a regular venue for international matches and cup finals, but in 1883 the club were forced to vacate the site to make way for the construction of the Cathcart Circle railway. After a year playing at Clydesdale Cricket Club's Titwood ground, a second Hampden was opened in October 1884. Whilst the club continued to attract major fixtures, they faced increasing competition as other Glasgow venues such as Celtic Park and Ibrox were developing their facilities more rapidly. To maintain their position in Scottish football, Queen's Park decided to purchase some farmland at Mount Florida, where the third Hampden was opened in 1903. Second Hampden was subsequently taken over by Third Lanark, who renamed it after their previous ground, Cathkin Park.

'Hampden' is one of the homes of football and celebrated its centenary on 31 October 2003. The stadium also houses the offices of the Scottish Football Association (SFA) and the Scottish Football Museum. Despite its large capacity and worldwide profile, it was owned by Queen's Park and leased by the SFA until 2020. It is the national football stadium of Scotland, the venue for all major cup finals and most Scotland international fixtures, and has hosted several continental showpiece events. 
Hampden Park was the largest stadium in the world until 1950, when the Maracanã in Rio de Janeiro was completed. Many of the record attendances in football were set at Hampden in the mid-20th century. After the release of the Taylor Report in the wake of the Hillsborough disaster, among other football tragedies, it was converted to an all-seater.

With matches in the 2012 Olympic Games having been played there, Hampden was converted into an athletics venue to be the main stadium of the 2014 Commonwealth Games.  This meant Queen's Park had to move its home games to the Excelsior Stadium in Airdrie for a full year; the cup finals and Scotland matches also went elsewhere. The stadium has hosted other sports including rugby union, American football, motorcycle speedway and boxing, as well as many music concerts.

Lesser Hampden is a smaller ground to the west of the main stadium which Queen's Park traditionally used for training and reserve team or youth matches. In 2018, a deal was made for the SFA to purchase Hampden from Queen's Park upon the expiry of the lease in 2020 for a fee of £5 million, with the club intending to improve Lesser Hampden and play their matches there. In November 2019 the club announced plans to redevelop Lesser Hampden into a 1,774 capacity ground. As of August 2020, ownership of the main stadium had been transferred to the SFA and a new facility was under construction at Lesser Hampden. Queen's Park played their last match at Hampden on 20 March 2021, as their lease on the ground expired at the end of the month. They groundshared at the Falkirk Stadium for the rest of the 2020–21 season, Firhill during 2021–22, and Ochilview in 2022–23. The club released a revised plan in December 2021.

Support 
Some of the Spiders' support call themselves the "Irn Bru Firm" and the Spangle Army  currently share a friendly relationship with supporters of German club SG Wattenscheid 09. This friendship resulted in Queen's spending their pre-season in the former city, which has been part of Bochum since 1975, for three consecutive years, in 2006, 2007, and 2008.

The club has an Honorary Patron, Lord Macfarlane of Bearsden.

Queen's Park Supporters' Association (QPSA) 
The Queen's Park Supporters' Association was founded over fifty years ago to help bring together people that share a common interest in the Queen's Park Football Club. In recent years membership has increased steadily, with supporters now registered throughout the world. As well as providing a channel to keep members informed of activities in and around Hampden, the association generates income which in turn goes towards helping to maintain the various activities within the club such as donations toward the youth set-up, club website or acknowledging the service of past and present players.

Running a club shop on match days and providing supporters' buses to away grounds as well as organising social events are some examples of the work the Association carries out every season.

Current squad

First team

Young Queen's Park

On loan

Coaching staff 
Director Of Football: Marijn Beuker
Head coach / First Team Manager: Owen Coyle
First-team coaches: Sandy Stewart, Owen Coyle Jnr
Goalkeeping coach: Glen Johnson
Sports scientist: Sam Harrison
Head physiotherapist: Euan Duffy
Club doctors: Simon Gibson, Kevin Thomson
Head of Youth & Pro Programme: Paul Nuijten
Head of academy coaching: Tommy McIntyre
Head of Children’s Programme: Thomas Ruesink
Young Queen's Park Head Coach: Paul Nuijten
Under 18s Head Coach: Charlie King
Under 16s Head Coach: Lee Mitchell
Under 15s Head Coach: David Watt
Under 14s Head Coach: Ryan McSherry
Under 13s Head Coach: John McNeil
Under 12s Head Coach: Ian McCall
Under 11s Head Coach: Robert Armour

Source:

Rivals 
Despite being located midway between Celtic and Rangers, Queen's Park's long resistance to professionalism has resulted in not having competed in the same division as those teams for long periods of time, and thus turning to rivals in lower divisions, such as Partick Thistle, Clyde, Albion Rovers and Third Lanark (the latter being the Spiders' closest neighbours until they went defunct in 1967).

Records 
Most capped player:
All at club: Walter Arnott (14 caps)
Including some at club: Alan Morton (31 total / 2 at club)
Played for club, international elsewhere: Andy Robertson (60 caps - ongoing as of 2023)

Most league points in a season:
2 points for a win: 57 (Division Two – season 1922–23)
3 points for a win: 69 (Third Division – season 1999–2000)

Most league points per game in a season:
2 points for a win: 1.5 (Division Two – 1922–23)
3 points for a win: 2.45 (League Two – 2020–21)

Most League goals in a season: Willie Martin (30 goals – season 1937–38)

Record victory: 16–0 vs St Peters (Scottish Cup, 26 August 1885)

Record defeat: 0–9 vs Motherwell (Division One, 29 April 1930)

Record attendance: 95,722 vs Rangers (Scottish Cup, 18 January 1930)

Honours

Major

League 
Scottish second tier
Winners (2): 1922–23, 1955–56
Scottish third tier
Winners: 1980–81 
Play-off winners: 2021–22
Scottish fourth tier
Winners (2): 1999–00, 2020–21
Play-off winners: 2006–07, 2015–16

Cup 
Scottish Cup
Winners (10): 1874, 1875, 1876, 1880, 1881, 1882, 1884, 1886, 1890, 1893
Runners-up: 1892, 1900
Sheriff of London Charity Shield
Winners: 1899 (shared)
FA Cup
Runners-up: 1884, 1885

Minor/Reserve 
Football World Championship: 
Winners (4): 1876, 1881, 1882, 1893
Glasgow Cup
Winners (4): 1889, 1890, 1899, 1946
Runners-up (8): 1896, 1898, 1929, 1932, 1940, 1965, 1985, 2022
Glasgow League
Winners: 1896–97
Runners-up: 1897–98
Glasgow Merchants Charity Cup 
Winners (8): 1877, 1878, 1880, 1881, 1883, 1884, 1885, 1891
Runners-up (20): 1889, 1890, 1894, 1896, 1906, 1908, 1917, 1919, 1920, 1922, 1923, 1926, 1928, 1931, 1933, 1935, 1937, 1953, 1955, 1957
Ayr Charity Cup
Winners (5): 1918, 1920, 1922, 1923, 1925
Scottish Amateur Cup
Winners (12): 1912, 1920, 1928, 1933, 1934, 1936, 1947, 1950, 1951, 1963, 1964, 2009
SPFL Reserve League
Winners: 2013–14
SPFL Reserve League Cup
Winners: 2013–14

See also
Club of Pioneers
List of Queen's Park F.C. players (100+ appearances)
List of Queen's Park F.C. international players

References 

Sources

External links

Official Website

Unofficial Websites
Spiders Talk – A Forum For Queen's Park Fans
QPFC.com - A Historical Queen's Park FC Website
News sites
BBC Queen's Park
History
History of the Queen's Park Football Club 1867 – 1917

 
Football clubs in Scotland
Association football clubs established in 1867
Football clubs in Glasgow
1867 establishments in Scotland
Scottish Football League teams
Scottish Cup winners
Scottish Football Association founder members
Scottish Professional Football League teams
Scottish Football Hall of Fame inductees
Govanhill and Crosshill